Christopher Jerrod Dooley Jr. (born March 7, 1989), better known by his stage name Hurricane Chris, is an American rapper. His commercial debut single was "A Bay Bay", and his debut studio album was 51/50 Ratchet (2007). In 2020, Chris was arrested for second degree murder.

Career

2007–08: Major label signing and breakthrough with 51/50 Ratchet
On April 10, 2007, Hurricane Chris released his debut commercial single, called "A Bay Bay". The song was produced by Phunk Dawg.

On August 8, Chris released the second commercial single, called "The Hand Clap". Phunk Dawg, who produced Chris' previous-commercial single ("A Bay Bay"), produces this track as well.

On August 17, Chris released his debut official mixtape, called Louisi-Animal. The remix of "A Bay Bay" was being included on the mixtape, featuring guest appearances from rappers The Game, Lil Boosie, E-40, Baby, Angie Locc and Jadakiss.

On October 23, Chris released his debut studio album, titled 51/50 Ratchet. The album debuted at number 24 on the US Billboard 200, selling 60,000 copies in the first week.

2009–10: Unleashed and record label disputes
On March 3, 2009, Chris released the first official single, called "Halle Berry (She's Fine)". The song features guest vocals from fellow local American rapper Superstarr, with the production work on this track being provided by also Superstarr himself, alongside the production duo Play-N-Skillz, and Q Smith.

On September 8, Chris released the second official single, called "Headboard". The song features guest appearances from American singer and songwriter Mario, and fellow American rapper Plies, with the production being provided by The Inkredibles.

On December 21, Chris released his second studio album, titled Unleashed. Unleashed did not chart internationally, however, the record peaked at number 46 on the US Billboard Top R&B/Hip-Hop Albums, and number 20 on the US Billboard Top Rap Albums charts, respectively.

2010–present: Releasing music and other ventures

After started releasing several mixtapes and singles between mid-2010 and early 2012, Chris released his single, titled "Bend It Over" (often times incorrectly titled as "Bend It Ova") on March 12, 2012. On January 2, 2013, Chris released his new mixtape, titled Caniac. On May 11, 2014, Chris released his single, titled "Ratchet". The song features guest appearances from a fellow American rapper Lil Boosie.

On August 21, 2015, Chris released his new single, called "Sections". The song features guest appearance from the American singer and songwriter Ty Dolla Sign. On September 4, Chris released his new mixtape, titled Hurricane Season. The tape features productions from DJ Mustard, Hitmaka, DubMagic Roe “!DubMagic!”, and Drumma Boy, among others.

Personal life
Dooley Jr. grew up in Shreveport; being affiliated with the Hoover 19 Family Park Bloods also known as the one nine bloods. On June 19, 2020, Dooley Jr. was arrested for second-degree murder in Shreveport. Police had responded in the early morning to a reported shooting at a gas station. They found 32-year-old Danzeria O. Farris suffering from multiple gunshot wounds. He was transported to a nearby hospital and later died. Dooley Jr.  stated that the shooting was in self-defense.

Discography

 51/50 Ratchet (2007)
 Unleashed (2009)

References

External links
 Hurricane Chris on Myspace

Living people
African-American male rappers
J Records artists
Musicians from Shreveport, Louisiana
Rappers from Louisiana
Southern hip hop musicians
21st-century American rappers
21st-century American male musicians
People charged with murder
1989 births
21st-century African-American musicians
20th-century African-American people